Tao Hongliang (born 17 February 1997) is a Chinese footballer currently playing as a midfielder for Zibo Qisheng in China League Two.

Club career
Tao Hongliang would play for the Shandong Luneng youth team before going abroad to join Norwegian football club Stabæk. He would be promoted to the senior team where on 27 November 2017 he would make his debut for them in a league game against Viking that ended in a 2-0 defeat, his appearance would make him the first Chinese person to play in the Norwegian league.

On 8 July 2019, Tao would return to China and join third tier football club Taizhou Yuanda. In his first season with the club he would aid the club to a third place finish and gain promotion to the second tier.

Career statistics
.

References

External links

1997 births
Living people
Chinese footballers
Chinese expatriate footballers
Association football midfielders
Stabæk Fotball players
Taizhou Yuanda F.C. players
China League Two players
China League One players
Chinese expatriate sportspeople in Norway
Expatriate footballers in Norway